Danny Lee Snodgrass Jr. (born October 20, 1992), professionally known as Taz Taylor, is an American record producer, songwriter, and record executive, as well as the founder of the Internet Money collective and record label.

He is signed to Warner Chappell Music, Artist Publishing Group and Atlantic Records on the publishing side, while currently signed as Internet Money Records with Ten Thousand Projects and Virgin Music on the label side. He formerly signed a record deal with Alamo Records and Interscope Records.

Early life
Danny Lee Snodgrass Jr. was born on October 20, 1992, in Jacksonville, Florida, where he was also raised. His father, the drummer for a local band, brought him to band practice where he began learning the drums, and guitar. Taylor lost interest in playing instruments as he grew up and dropped out of school in 7th grade. At the age of 17, his mother was diagnosed with cancer, and Taylor looked for a new way of earning income. After a brief stint as a graphic designer, Taylor turned to production. He sold his first beat online for $250, and began to produce full-time.

Career
After realizing that he could make money selling beats online, Taylor pawned many of his possessions to furnish his in-home studio. As he developed his beat creation, he also developed his business strategy, which at first revolved around using Twitter and PayPal to sell his beats to any artist who wanted them. Taylor sells his creations via a one-time payment for usage of his material, eschewing the more complicated publishing and songwriting deals traditionally preferred by producers. In 2016, Taylor placed songs with Trey Songz and Desiigner, which were his first major placements. This led to a publishing deal signed in August 2017 with Warner Chappell Music, Artist Publishing Group and Atlantic Records, which allowed him to lease his works in the traditional way, as well as independently sell beats via his Internet Money YouTube channel.

Internet Money Records

Internet Money Records is a record label and record producer collective founded by Taz Taylor, Nick Mira, and DT (formerly known as Sidepce), with Taylor being CEO. A blend of a YouTube channel, a record label, and a producer union, Internet Money is a medium for producers to sell beats, as well as an aggregator for producers and creatives. Beyond helping other producers with the business side of making music, Taylor and Internet Money host "tours", where producers can collaborate and work together. Taylor believes that Internet Money is a way to help producers make money off of music using the same techniques he uses. In 2018, Internet Money Records signed a record deal with Alamo Records and Interscope Records. During a stint in mid-2019, Taz's relationship with Alamo and Interscope soured. By late summer, Taz had agreed to a buyout with Alamo and Interscope and signed a new record deal with TenThousand Projects and Virgin Music, giving him more control of who he could sign to the joint venture.

As a producer collective, Internet Money has been responsible for multiple singles that have ascended the Billboard Hot 100, and has earned the RIAA Platinum and Gold certificates as well.

The label released their debut album, B4 the Storm on August 28, 2020. It includes vocals from Future, Kevin Gates, Gunna, Don Toliver, Nav, Trippie Redd, Juice Wrld, 24kGoldn, Iann Dior and the Kid Laroi, among others.

Production credits
Taz Taylor has produced for Juice WRLD, Drake, Lil Skies, Tay-K, Trippie Redd, and many others. In 2019, he collaborated with fellow producer Nick Mira on the song, "Ransom", by Lil Tecca, later becoming a top five hit on the Billboard Hot 100.

Production credits

2017

XXXTentacion - 17
8. "Fuck Love" (featuring Trippie Redd)

2018

Juice Wrld - Goodbye & Good Riddance
10. "Candles"

2019

Lil Tecca - We Love You Tecca
1. "Ransom" 
2. "Shots"

2020

Internet Money - B4 the Storm (Complete Edition)

2021

Dro Kenji - F*CK YOUR FEELINGS
5. "DANGEROUS" 
8. "HADES" 
10. "LAMBO TRUCK" 
11. "EXPENSIVE"

The Kid LAROI - F*CK LOVE 3: OVER YOU
3. "LONELY AND F*CKED UP"

2022

Internet Money - We All We Got -EP 
5.  "Codeine Cowboy" (featuring Lil Yachty)

Drake - Her Loss
4.  "BackOutsideBoyz"

Rot Ken - Yahweh Child 
6.  "No Mind" 
7.  "Glock 23" 
15.  "007"

2023

Tana - Gaultier 
2.  "Archive" 
4.  "Hell Nah" 
8.  "Swaggin Like This" (featuring Lancey Foux) 
9.  "As I Walk Thru the Path"

Rich Amiri - Evolution 
1.  "Mention" 
2.  "Don't Feel Ya" 
5.  "Salty" 
6.  "Poppin" (featuring Lil Tecca) 
7.  "Ballin" 
8.  "Don't Exist" 
9.  "Ace" 
12.  "Can't Die"

Non-Album Singles
"Smile" (Juice WRLD & The Weeknd) 
"His & Hers" - Internet Money (featuring Don Toliver, Gunna, & Lil Uzi Vert)  
"V12" - iann dior (featuring Lil Uzi Vert) 
"Beautiful" - Rot Ken (featuring SoFaygo) 
"FINDERS KEEPERS" - Dro Kenji & Scorey 
"Hoe Friends" - BFB Da Packman 
"UDNTLUVME" - Dro Kenji

References

Living people
American hip hop record producers
1992 births